Black Is the Color of My True Love's Hair is the title of a 2003 EP by the American rock band The Twilight Singers. The song "Black Is the Colour (Of My True Love's Hair)" is a traditional folk song which was first known in the United States about 1915. However, it may have come from Scotland originally. It is about a girl who is waiting for her lover to return from sea. Greg Dulli's cover of the song would later appear on The Twilight Singers' 2004 covers album She Loves You.

Burlesque revivalist Dita Von Teese is pictured on the front cover of the EP.

Track listing
 "Black Is the Color of My True Love's Hair"
 "Domani"
 "Son of the Morning Star"

2003 EPs